James Hamish Watson (17 February 1896 – 28 December 1978) was an Australian rules footballer who played with Carlton and Fitzroy in the Victorian Football League (VFL).

Notes

External links 

Jim Watson's profile at Blueseum

1896 births
1978 deaths
Australian rules footballers from Melbourne
Carlton Football Club players
Fitzroy Football Club players
Australian military personnel of World War I
People from Windsor, Victoria
Military personnel from Melbourne